Jordanoleiopus bifuscoplagiatus is a species of beetle in the family Cerambycidae, the long-horned beetle. It was described by Báguena and Breuning in 1958.

References

Polymistoleiopus
Beetles described in 1958
Taxa named by Stephan von Breuning (entomologist)
Taxa named by Luis Báguena-Corella